Kuttasat is a khum (commune) of Ou Chrov District in Banteay Meanchey Province in north-western Cambodia.

Villages

 Koub Touch(គប់តូច)
 Kaoh Char(កោះចារ)
 Kuttaksat(គុត្តសត)
 Yeay Ort(យាយអត)

References

Communes of Banteay Meanchey province
Ou Chrov District